This is a list of flag bearers who have represented Kyrgyzstan at the Olympics.

Flag bearers carry the national flag of their country at the opening ceremony of the Olympic Games.

See also
Kyrgyzstan at the Olympics

References

Flag bearers
Kyrgyzstan
Olympic flagbearers
Olympic flagbearers